Geocoryne is a genus of fungi within the Leotiaceae family.

References

External links
Index Fungorum

Helotiales